The 2023 Vissel Kobe season is their 57th season in existence and the 8th consecutive season in the J1 League, since the club earned promotion back to it on 2013. In addition to the league, the club competes in the Emperor's Cup and the J. League Cup.

Players

Current squad 
.

Players' ages here are displayed in accordance with the opening of the J1 season, 18 February 2023.

Out on loan

Transfers

Pre-season friendlies

Competitions

Overall record

J1 League

League table

Results summary

Results by round

Matches 
The opening match was released by the J.League on 23 December 2022. The full league fixtures were released on 20 January 2023.

J.League Cup 

The club started the competition at the group stage.

Goalscorers 
Updated as of 11 March 2023.

References

External links 
 Official website 

Vissel Kobe seasons
Vissel Kobe